Richard Charles Paulet, 17th Marquess of Winchester (born on 8 July 1905; died 5 March 1968) was the son of Charles Standish Paulet and Lillian Jane Charlotte Fosbery. He inherited the title of 17th Marquess of Winchester from Henry Paulet, 16th Marquess of Winchester, through Charles Paulet, 13th Marquess of Winchester. He died unmarried, and the title was passed to his 26 year old cousin Nigel Paulet, 18th Marquess of Winchester.

References 

1905 births
Richard
1968 deaths
17
20th-century English nobility